Gesonia is a genus of moths of the family Erebidae erected by Francis Walker in 1859.

Species
 Gesonia dinawa (Bethune-Baker, 1906)
 Gesonia elongalis (Viette, 1954)
 Gesonia gemma Swinhoe, 1885
 Gesonia grisea Wileman & West, 1928
 Gesonia holochrysa (Meyrick, 1902)
 Gesonia inscitia (Swinhoe, 1885)
 Gesonia irrorata (Bethune-Baker, 1908)
 Gesonia mesoscota (Hampson, 1904)
 Gesonia nigripalpa Wiltshire, 1977
 Gesonia obeditalis Walker, [1859]
 Gesonia silvestralis Viette, 1956
 Gesonia stictigramma Hampson, 1926
 Gesonia thermesina Hampson, 1926

References

Calpinae
Noctuoidea genera